Cherry Ripe is a 1921 British silent romance film directed by Kenelm Foss and starring Mary Odette, Lionelle Howard and Roy Travers. The film is based on the 1878 novel of the same title by Helen Mathers which is itself named after the traditional song "Cherry Ripe".

Cast
 Mary Odette as Mignon  
 Lionelle Howard as Adam Montrose  
 H.V. Tollemach as Christopher Codrington  
 Roy Travers as Philip Lamert  
 Peggy Bayfield as Muriel  
 Gwen Williams as Miss Sorel  
 Will Corrie as Silas Sorel  
 Julie Kean as Puck  
 Beatie Olna Travers as Prue

References

Bibliography
 Low, Rachael. History of the British Film, 1918-1929. George Allen & Unwin, 1971.

External links

1921 films
1921 romantic drama films
British silent feature films
British romantic drama films
Films directed by Kenelm Foss
Films based on British novels
Films set in England
British black-and-white films
1920s English-language films
1920s British films
Silent romantic drama films